Abdullah Al-Rashidi (born 28 March 1997) is a Saudi Arabian professional footballer who plays as a right back for Saudi Professional League side Al-Ain.

Career
Al-Rashidi started his career at the youth team of Ohod and represented the club at every level. On 3 February 2019, Al-Rashidi joined Al-Ain on loan until the end of the season from Ohod. After returning to Ohod, Al-Rashidi went on to make 4 appearances in all competitions before being loaned to Al-Ain once again on 6 January 2020. Al-Rashidi also helped Al-Ain achieve promotion to the Pro League for the first time in the club's history. On 2 October 2020, Al-Rashidi joined Al-Ain on a permanent basis. He signed a three-year contract with the club.

References

External links
 

1997 births
Living people
People from Medina
Saudi Arabian footballers
Association football fullbacks
Ohod Club players
Al-Ain FC (Saudi Arabia) players
Saudi Professional League players
Saudi First Division League players